Antrim County Airport  is a county-owned public-use airport located one mile (2 km) northeast of the central business district of Bellaire, a village in Antrim County, Michigan, United States. It is included in the Federal Aviation Administration (FAA) National Plan of Integrated Airport Systems for 2017–2021, in which it is categorized as a local general aviation facility.

Facilities and aircraft 
For the 12-month period ending December 31, 2018, the airport had 7,300 aircraft operations, an average of 20 per day, all general aviation. For the same time period, there are 20 airplanes based on the field: 19 single-engine and 1 multi-engine.

The airport has a fixed-base operator that sells fuel and has a conference room.

References

External links 
Antrim County Airport

Airports in Michigan
Buildings and structures in Antrim County, Michigan
Michigan
County government agencies in Michigan
Transportation in Antrim County, Michigan